Dark Brown may refer to:
 Dark brown
 Dark Brown (1957 film), an Australian television film
 Dark Brown (1963 film), another version of the above